The Albany Rollers were a minor league baseball team based in Albany, Oregon. In 1904, the Rollers became members of the Class D level Oregon State League during the season, hosting home games at the Albany Base Ball Park. The Albany Rollers came into existence when the Vancouver Soldiers were forced to relocate to Albany after a territory dispute with the Pacific Coast League.

History
The 1904 Albany Rollers became members of the Class D level Oregon State League after the season had begun. The four–team league began play on April 8, 1904. The charter teams beginning the season were the Eugene Blues, Roseburg Shamrocks, Salem Raglans and Vancouver Soldiers. League salaries were capped at $600.

After their first season began play, the Oregon State League had not officially been admitted to minor league baseball by the National Association governing body. The Oregon State League had not vacated the Vancouver, Washington franchise after the National Association had ruled Vancouver was within the territorial limit of the Portland, Oregon franchise of the Pacific Coast League. To meet the requirement, the Vancouver Soldiers franchise moved to Albany, Oregon on May 18, 1904, and became the "Albany Rollers". Vancouver had a record of 3–8 at the time of the move. Prior to the move, on May 12, 1904, it was reported that E. P. Preble, the owner/manager of Vancouver, had visited Albany and spoke with residents about the possibility of the move. Albany residents, who had earlier supported the prospect of an Albany team in the Oregon State League when the league was formed, began a pledge drive to raise money to support the potential franchise, but were met with some resistance from local businesses before the move to Albany was ultimately made.

The "Rollers" moniker corresponds to the timber industry, which was a strong local industry in the era.

As the Oregon State League continued regular season play, both the Eugene Blues and Roseburg Shamrocks franchises disbanded on July 6, 1904. Travel costs were cited as a reason for folding. The loss of the two franchises caused the Oregon State League, Albany included, to immediately disband.

The Albany Rollers were in 3rd place in the Oregon State League standings when the league permanently folded on July 6, 1904. The Vancouver/Albany team ended the Oregon State League season with an overall record of 17–24, playing under managers Fred Gregory and E.P. Preble. The Vancouver/Albany team finished 9.5 games behind the 1st place Salem Raglans. In the final standings, Albany finished behind 1st place Salem (27–13), 2nd place Eugene Blues (22–19) and ahead of the 4th place Roseburg Shamrocks (15–25).

Albany, Oregon has not hosted another minor league team.

The ballpark
The Albany Rollers played home games at the Albany Base Ball Park. The ballpark was adjacent to the gymnasium on the campus of the Albany Collegiate Institute. After the college relocated, the former campus grounds became the site of the Albany Research Center, operated by the U.S. Department of Energy.

Timeline

Year–by–year record

Notable alumni
No Vancouver/Albany players played in the major leagues.

References

External links
 Baseball Reference

Defunct minor league baseball teams
Defunct baseball teams in Oregon
Baseball teams established in 1904
Baseball teams disestablished in 1904
Albany, Oregon
Linn County, Oregon
Benton County, Oregon
Oregon State League teams
1904 disestablishments in Oregon